The 1995–96 North West Counties Football League season was the 14th in the history of the North West Counties Football League, a football competition in England. Teams were divided into two divisions: Division One and Division Two.

Division One 

Division One featured two new teams:

 Flixton promoted as champions of Division Two
 Mossley relegated from the NPL Division One

League table

Division Two 

Division Two featured four new teams:

 Bacup Borough, relegated from Division One
 Middlewich Athletic, joined from the Mid-Cheshire Football League
 Ramsbottom United, joined from the Manchester Football League
 Vauxhall GM, joined from the West Cheshire League

League table

References

External links 
 NWCFL Official Site

North West Counties Football League seasons
8